Luiz Heinrich Mann (27 March 1871 – 11 March 1950), best known as simply Heinrich Mann, was a German author known for his socio-political novels. From 1930 until 1933, he was president of the fine poetry division of the Prussian Academy of Arts. His fierce criticism of the growing Fascism and Nazism forced him to flee Germany after the Nazis came to power during 1933. He was the elder brother of writer Thomas Mann.

Early life

Born in Lübeck, as the oldest child of Senator Thomas Johann Heinrich Mann, grain merchant and finance minister of the Free City of Lübeck, a state of the German Empire, and Júlia da Silva Bruhns. He was the elder brother of the writer Thomas Mann with whom he had a lifelong rivalry. The Mann family was an affluent family of grain merchants of the Hanseatic city of Lübeck. After the death of his father, his mother relocated the family to Munich, where Heinrich began his career as a freier Schriftsteller (free novelist).

Work
Mann's essay on Émile Zola and the novel Der Untertan (published over the years 1912-1918) earned him much respect during the Weimar Republic, since they satirized Imperial German society. Later, in 1930, his book Professor Unrat was freely adapted into the movie Der Blaue Engel (The Blue Angel). Carl Zuckmayer wrote the script, and Josef von Sternberg was the director. Mann wanted his paramour, the actress Trude Hesterberg, to play the main female part as the "actress" Lola Lola (named Rosa Fröhlich in the novel), but Marlene Dietrich was given the part, her first sound role.

Together with Albert Einstein and other celebrities during 1932, Mann was a signatory to the "Urgent Call for Unity", asking the voters to reject the Nazis. Einstein and Mann had previously co-authored a letter during 1931 condemning the murder of Croatian scholar Milan Šufflay.

Mann became persona non grata in Nazi Germany and left even before the Reichstag fire of 1933. He went to France where he lived in Paris and Nice. During the German occupation, he made his way to Marseille, where he was aided by Varian Fry in September 1940 to escape to Spain. Assisted by Justus Rosenberg, he and his wife Nelly Kröger, his nephew Golo Mann, Alma Mahler-Werfel and Franz Werfel hiked for six hours across the border at Port Bou. After arriving in Portugal, the group stayed in Monte Estoril, at the Grande Hotel D’Itália, between 18 September and 4 October 1940. On 4 October 1940, they boarded the S.S. Nea Hellas, headed for New York City.

The Nazis burnt Heinrich Mann's books as "contrary to the German spirit" during the infamous book burning of May 10, 1933, which was instigated by the then Nazi propaganda minister Joseph Goebbels.

Later life

During the 1930s and later in American exile, Mann's literary popularity waned. Nevertheless, he wrote Die Jugend des Königs Henri Quatre and Die Vollendung des Königs Henri Quatre as part of the Exilliteratur. The two novels described the life and importance of Henry IV of France and were acclaimed by his brother Thomas Mann, who spoke of the "great splendour and dynamic art" of the work. The plot, based on Europe's early modern history from a French perspective, anticipated the end of French–German enmity.

His second wife,  (1898–1944), committed suicide in Los Angeles.

Heinrich Mann died on March 11, 1950, sixteen days before his 79th birthday, in Santa Monica, California, lonely and without much money, just months before he was to relocate to East Berlin to become president of the German Academy of Arts. His ashes were later taken to East Germany and were interred at the Dorotheenstadt Cemetery in a grave of honor.

Popular culture
Mann was portrayed by Alec Guinness in the television adaptation of Christopher Hampton's play Tales from Hollywood (1992).

In Die Manns – Ein Jahrhundertroman (2001) he was played by Jürgen Hentsch.

Film adaptations
The Blue Angel, directed by Josef von Sternberg (Germany, 1930, based on the novel Professor Unrat)
Der Untertan, directed by Wolfgang Staudte (East Germany, 1951, based on the novel Der Untertan)
The Blue Angel, directed by Edward Dmytryk (USA, 1959, based on the novel Professor Unrat)
Madame Legros, directed by Michael Kehlmann (West Germany, 1968, TV film, based on the play Madame Legros)
Man of Straw, directed by Herbert Wise (UK, 1972, TV miniseries, based on the novel Der Untertan)
Im Schlaraffenland, directed by Kurt Jung-Alsen (East Germany, 1975, TV film, based on the novel Im Schlaraffenland)
Belcanto oder Darf eine Nutte schluchzen?, directed by Robert van Ackeren (West Germany, 1977, based on the novel Empfang bei der Welt)
Im Schlaraffenland, directed by Fritz Umgelter (West Germany, 1981, TV film, based on the novel Im Schlaraffenland)
Suturp – Eine Liebesgeschichte, directed by Gerd Keil (East Germany, 1981, TV film, based on the short story Suturp)
, directed by Alexander Lang (East Germany, 1983, TV film, based on the unfinished Die traurige Geschichte von Friedrich dem Großen)
Henri 4, directed by Jo Baier (Germany, 2010, based on the novels Die Jugend des Königs Henri Quatre and Die Vollendung des Königs Henri Quatre)

See also 
 Exilliteratur
 Dohm-Mann family tree
 Urgent Call for Unity

References

Further reading
 Gross, David: The Writer and Society: Heinrich Mann and Literary Politics in Germany, 1890–1940, Humanities Press, New Jersey, 1980,
 Hamilton, Nigel: The Brothers Mann: The Lives of Heinrich and Thomas Mann, Yale University Press, (1978),
 Juers, Evelyn: House of Exile: The Life and Times of Heinrich Mann and Nelly Kroeger-Mann, Giramondo Publishing Co., Australia, 2008,
 Mauthner, Martin: German Writers in French Exile, 1933–1940, Vallentine Mitchell, London, 2007,.
 Walter Fähnders/Walter Delabar: Heinrich Mann (1871–1950).  Berlin 2005 (Memoria 4)
 Heinrich Mann's life in California during World War II, including his relationship with Nelly Mann, Thomas Mann and Bertolt Brecht, is a subject of Christopher Hampton's play Tales from Hollywood, where he was played in film by Jeremy Irons (BBC Video Performance: “Tales from Hollywood”, 1992) and on stage by Keir Dullea (Guthrie Theater, Minneapolis, Minnesota, 2012).

External links

 
 
 
 

1871 births
1950 deaths
Writers from Lübeck
20th-century German novelists
German essayists
German biographers
Male biographers
German poets
19th-century German writers
Exilliteratur writers
German World War I poets
German pacifists
German people of Brazilian descent
People of the Weimar Republic
Heinrich
German expatriates in the United States
Recipients of the National Prize of East Germany
20th-century biographers
German male essayists
German male poets
German male novelists
German anti-fascists
19th-century essayists
20th-century essayists
19th-century German male writers
20th-century German male writers